Bola Tinubu (born 1952 according to affidavits) is a Nigerian politician who is currently president elect of Nigeria.

Tinubu may also refer to:

People 

 Oluremi Tinubu
 Wale Tinubu
 Efunroye Tinubu
 Folashade Tinubu-Ojo
 Sam Tinubu
 Gloria Bromell Tinubu

Places 

 Tinubu Square
 Johnson Jakande Tinubu Park

See also